Warren Edwards is a shoe designer. He was born in London and moved to New York City in his early 20s. Along with Susan Bennis, he co-founded and designed shoes under the name Susan Bennis/Warren Edwards. Following the closure of the company in 1997, Edwards went solo in 1998, opening a shop on Park Avenue, New York, where he was still based in 2010. In 2000, he was specialising in slightly modified classic styles of business and business-casual footwear for New York professionals.

In 1991, Edwards was the Grisham-Trentham lecturer at the Auburn University School of Human Sciences.

See also
List of Auburn University people

References

External links
 New York Magazine, May 3, 1999, "Shopping:  Best Men's Custom Shoes"
 "Official Website"

Shoe designers
Living people
Auburn University faculty
Year of birth missing (living people)